The Užice dialect or Zlatibor dialect (Serbo-Croatian: užički govor / ужички говор or zlatiborski govor / златиборски говор) is a subdialect of the Shtokavian dialect of the Serbo-Croatian language. It is part of the Eastern Herzegovinian subdialects. It is traditionally spoken by c. 500,000 peoplethe Bosniaks and Serbs of the regionin the Zlatibor and Moravica Districts in the Užice region (Stari Vlah) in the southwestern part of Serbia.

Names 
One of the earliest mentions of the local dialect of Užice region is found in Ottoman geographer Evliya Çelebi's record on his visit to the Užice nahiya in 1664. In his travelogue, the language of Užicans is called the Bosnian language.

Today Orthodox people in the Užice region usually claim to speak Serbian, whereas Muslims (who primarily dwell in the municipalities of Nova Varoš, Priboj, Prijepolje, and Sjenica in the Zlatibor District) claim to speak Bosnian. The name Serbo-Croatian was also used during the Yugoslav era.

Classification 

The Užice dialect is a Neo-Štokavian dialect with Ijekavian accent. It is characterized by an Eastern Herzegovinian accenting system consisting of four pitch accents with long vowels following accented syllables, and a case system using full declension. Today many people in the Užice region, especially in urban areas, use the Ekavian accent (which is dominant in Serbia) in speech and writing, instead of the traditional Ijekavian. Nevertheless, the original Ijekavian forms of local toponyms such as Bioska, Đetinja, Prijepolje, Bjeluša, Kosjerić, Drijetanj etc., are usually preserved, as these are the names used in official documents and other publications. However, there is also a number of toponyms which were Ekavized in the written language, although their original Ijekavian forms have often survived in the spoken language. These include Donja Bela Reka / Gornja Bela Reka, Kriva Reka, Seništa and others, which can often be heard as Bijela Rijeka, Kriva Rijeka, Sjeništa etc. in conversation among the locals.

In the Central South Slavic dialect continuum, the Užice dialect forms a transition between the neighbouring dialects of Bosnia and Herzegovina and the dialects of Serbia. Some of its characteristics are shared with either dialects, but many of them are common with the Bosnian vernacular rather than the dialects of the rest of Serbia; including the traditional Ijekavian reflex of yat, the reduction of short unaccented vowels in speech, and other characteristics of the local phonetics, morphology, and lexis, the latter manifested primarily in many loanwords from Turkish, Persian, and Arabic languages, which are, however, suppressed and less used in the modern language. The connections between the Užice region and Bosnia were even stronger in the past, as parts of this region once belonged to the mediaeval Bosnian state, and the mediaeval local population were followers of the Church of Bosnia.

History 
The local population descends from the Slavs who mixed with Illyrian and Celtic tribes in the early Middle Ages, and therefore the dialect in its earliest mediaeval form has been rather influenced by the Celtic and Illyrian languages, the remaining of which are some local toponyms of Illyrian or Romanized Celtic etymology, such as Tara Mountain, Negbina, Murtenica, Čigota etc., or the mediaeval Užican personal name Brajan of Celtic origin.

Mediaeval records of local toponyms show Ikavian characteristics of the local Slavonic vernacular, similarly to the mediaeval Bosnian language. These toponyms include Bila Rika, Siča Rika, Biluša, and others, which are today known as Bela Reka or Bijela Rijeka, Seča Reka, and Bjeluša (either Ijekavian accent or Ekavized during the 19th and 20th centuries).

The dialect’s vocabulary was later influenced by the Ottoman Turkish language. A mention of the respectable Turkish influence on Užican language and mentality is also found in the novel Došljaci by a notable Užice writer Milutin Uskoković:

During the 17th, 18th, and 19th centuries, the Užice region was mostly populated by the migrants from Herzegovina, Montenegro, and other Dinaric regions. Most of the present-day Užicans descend from these settlers. The local dialect was then influenced by the Younger Ijekavian dialects of Herzegovina and Montenegro, and thus became one of the Eastern Herzegovinian dialects.

Characteristics 
 Interrogatory pronouns are šta (what) and ko (who), according to which the pronoun nešta (something) is used instead of the standard nešto; and što (why) is used with the meaning of the standard zašto.
 The dialect has younger Štokavian accentuation consisting of four accents and long vowels following the accented syllables, and the full declension using the ending -a in genitive plural and a same form for dative, instrumental, and locative plural. The post-accent long vowels are more frequent in the Užican dialect than in the standard language, appearing on all vocative endings and the praeterite suffixes.
 The old vowel yat is replaced with ije in long syllables and je in the short ones. Before another vowel or a palatal consonant, it is replaced with i, and after a consonant cluster or the consonant r, it is pronounced as e. The reflex of long yat (ije) is always bisyllabic, while it is diphthongal in some other Ijekavian dialects.
 The older Ijekavian yat reflex has been kept in several pronouns and declension endings: ovijem instead of the standard ovim, moijem instead of mojim, starijem for starim etc.
 The dialectal Ijekavian iotation (dj > đ , tj > ć ) has been preserved: đe for gdje, đevojka for djevojka, đeca for djeca, međed for medvjed, lećeti for letjeti, ćerati for tjerati etc. More archaic Ijekavian iotation affecting labial sounds (pj > plj , vj > vlj ) is found in the text of the Prophecy of Kremna but is, however, usually omitted.
 Several dialectal words and expressions are differently built, such as: sjutra or sjutre (that is, śutra or śutre when the iotation occurs) instead of the standard sutra; puštiti instead of pustiti; jošte instead of još; računjati instead of računati; morem, more instead of mogu, može; bidem or bidnem instead of budem; četri instead of četiri; potlje and pošlje instead of poslije or posle; as well as dialectal expressions najvolim and najposle.
 The ending -t is used instead of -n for the passive voice of the verbs of the II, IV, V, and VII grammatical conjugation: napisat, napisata for napisan, napisana; izabrat for izabran and so on.
The sound  is also less used when occurs near the vowel  giving starii for stariji, moi for moji, Alin for Alijin (as in toponym Alin Potok) etc.
 Several sound changes such as sibilarization, assimilation, metathesis or elision occur more frequently in the Užican dialect, whilst i-mutation usually occurs less frequently. Vowel groups ao and ae have merged into o and e: rekao > reko, posao > poso, dvanaest > dvanes.
 The dialect's lexis includes some regional and archaic expressions as well as many loans from Turkish.

Phonetics

Literature 
The significant portion of the Užican vernacular literature consists of local anecdotes and proverbs, as well as the epic and lyric poems, both of which are usually sung according to a common metric system consisting of ten units (ten syllables in a verse), and often performed with gusle. The hero of all Užican anecdotes is called Ero (another name for Užicans, also spelled Era), who is portrayed as a most clever, witty, and hospitable person, although he is just a simple Zlatiborian peasant. In these short anecdotes, he always succeeds to trick the others at the end, even though they hold a higher position in the society or are often considered smarter than him (priests, Ottoman and Serbian nobility, the police, etc.). Characters similar to smart and clever Ero are found in anecdotes across the Balkans: in the stories about Nasredin Hodža, of oriental origin, or Karagiozis in the Greek and Turkish literatures.

The written literature, on the other hand, usually stuck to the standard language; that is Old Church Slavonic and Church Slavonic in the Middle Ages, and later the standard Serbian language. The first Užican printed book, Rujansko četvorojevanđelje (the Gospels of Rujno), was printed in Church Slavonic in 1537. Other Church Slavonic books printed in the Užice region include Psalter printed in Mileševa monastery in 1544, and Evangelion and Pentecostarion printed in Mrkša’s Church in 1562 and 1566, respectively. After the printing centres in Užican monasteries were demolished by the Ottoman Turks, a manuscript culture arose in the Rača monastery. The manuscripts produced in Rača were written in Church Slavonic, but they contained many elements of the Užican vernacular. The first works compiled in the local dialect by literate Užicans appeared in the 19th century. They include Miladin Radović's chronicle Samouki rukopis, and the Prophecy of Kremna which was told by Zechariah Zaharić, the protopope of Kremna.

References

External links 

 The history of the traditional dialect of Užice
 Kratka istorija starovlaške književnosti

Užice
Dialects by location
Languages attested from the 17th century